Guaros Fútbol Club was a Venezuelan professional football club based in Barquisimeto. The club played from 2006 to 2009 in the Venezuelan Primera División.

2006 establishments in Venezuela
2009 disestablishments in Venezuela
Sport in Barquisimeto
Football clubs in Venezuela
Defunct football clubs in Venezuela